Brian van Niekerk (born 10 January 1933) is a Rhodesian former boxer. He competed in the men's light middleweight event at the 1960 Summer Olympics, representing Rhodesia. At the 1960 Summer Olympics, he lost to Carmelo Bossi of Italy.

References

External links
 

1933 births
Living people
Rhodesian male boxers
Olympic boxers of Rhodesia
Boxers at the 1960 Summer Olympics
People from Benoni
South African emigrants to Rhodesia
Light-middleweight boxers
Sportspeople from Gauteng